Heliotaurus is a genus of comb-clawed beetles in the family Tenebrionidae. There are at least six described species in Heliotaurus. They are found in the Palearctic and tropical Africa.

Species
These species belong to the genus Heliotaurus:
 Heliotaurus crassidactylus Seidlitz, 1896
 Heliotaurus ruficollis (Fabricius, 1781)
 Heliotaurus rufithorax Reitter, 1906
 Heliotaurus sanguinicollis Reitter, 1906
 Heliotaurus seidlitzi Reitter, 1906
 Heliotaurus tenuipes Seidlitz, 1896

References

External links

 

Tenebrionoidea